F. japonica  may refer to:
 Fagus japonica, the Japanese blue beech, a deciduous tree species native to Japan
 Fallopia japonica, the Japanese knotweed, a large herbaceous perennial plant species native to Japan, China and Korea
 Fatsia japonica, the fatsi or Japanese aralia, a plant species native to southern Japan

See also
 Japonica (disambiguation)